Mark Chadwick, better known by his stage name Chad Jackson, is an English DJ, remixer and record producer. He is best known for his hit single "Hear the Drummer (Get Wicked)", but he also created member-only mixes for the Disco Mix Club (DMC).

Music career 
Jackson was born in St Helens, Merseyside.

He won the DMC World Championships competition in 1987. His career started in 1990 with his debut single "Hear the Drummer (Get Wicked)", which consisted of samples.  It was a hit, peaking at number 1 on the UK Dance Chart and number 3 on the UK Singles Chart. The track was based around a horn sample from Marva Whitney's 1969 single "Unwind Yourself" and also heavily sampled the 1973 song "For The Love Of Money" By The O'Jays. However, his second single "Freedom to Party (Construction Mix)" failed to chart.  He then made a remix of "Under my Skin" by Frank Sinatra along with DJ Luca. It was released on Juno Records in 2011.

He has also performed under the pseudonym "Drumscape".

Discography

EPs 
1996: New Wave of Undergrounds (with GM)

Singles 
1990: "Freedom to Party (Construction Mix)"
1990: "Hear the Drummer (Get Wicked)" – UK No. 3
1997: "Stay Calm"
2000: "Hear the Drummer Part Two"
2002: "Break"
2002: "Rock"
2005: "Do You Do Voodoo"
2005: "Get Yer Boogie On" / "Deep Organ"

Remixes
1990: Paula Abdul – "Cold Hearted" (Chad Jackson/12" Re-Mix)
2011: Frank Sinatra – "Under My Skin" (Chad Jackson and DJ Luca Remix)

References 

Year of birth missing (living people)
English DJs
English record producers
British hip hop DJs
Living people
DJs from Manchester
People from St Helens, Merseyside